Curse is a 1983 album by The Legendary Pink Dots.

Track listing

Personnel
D'Archangel (Edward Ka-Spel) –  vocals, glox
The Silver Man (Phil Knight) – synthesizers, malvezh, percussion
Stret Majest (Barry Gray) – guitars, prazhada
Prüümptje Jüste (Roland Calloway) –  bass, suste glox
Aradia (April Iliffe) – keyboards, occ. vocal, glox

Additional personnel
Keith Thompson – drums, vocal
Sally Graves – flute, voice
Pazhklah Zzäpp (Patrick White) – extra percussion

Engineered by Pat Bermingham

Notes
The initial release by In Phaze was limited to 2,500 copies. Both the Big Blue and Soleilmoon editions feature different artwork, while the former also includes a lyric booklet.

References

1983 albums
The Legendary Pink Dots albums